"The Composer" is a 1969 song released for Diana Ross & the Supremes by the Motown label.

Background
Written and produced by Smokey Robinson, the song is featured on their album Let the Sunshine In and peaked at number 27 on the Billboard Hot 100 pop singles chart in the United States in May 1969. It was not released as a single in the UK. As with many Diana Ross & the Supremes singles recorded between 1968–69, Mary Wilson and Cindy Birdsong did not sing on the record but rather Motown session singers The Andantes. "The Composer" is one of only a few Supremes releases that was not performed on any television show. The song was rerecorded by Smokey Robinson & the Miracles for their 1969 album, Time Out for Smokey Robinson & the Miracles.

Cash Box described it as "a sumptuous love song filled with the imagery of 'I Hear a Symphony'" and "standout production touches."

Personnel
 Lead vocals by Diana Ross
 Background vocals by the Andantes: Jackie Hicks, Marlene Barrow, and Louvain Demps
 Instrumentation by the Funk Brothers

Track listing
7" single (27 March 1969) (North America/Germany/Netherlands)
"The Composer" – 2:55
"The Beginning of the End" – 2:29

Chart history

References

1969 singles
Songs written by Smokey Robinson
The Supremes songs
The Miracles songs
Motown singles
Song recordings produced by Smokey Robinson
1969 songs